Liz Canner is an American filmmaker who makes documentaries, digital public art installations and new media projects on human rights issues. Her documentary Deadly Embrace: Nicaragua, The World Bank and the IMF (1995), was one of the first films to look critically at the effects of the International Monetary Fund, World Bank policy and globalization.  In 2009 Canner directed Orgasm Inc.: The Strange Science of Female Pleasure (2009), a feature-length investigative documentary on the pharmaceutical industry and women's health.

Canner is the founder and director of Astrea Media, Inc., a nonprofit organization dedicated to creating media projects on human rights issues.

Canner graduated with honors in anthropology and visual arts from Brown University in 1991.  She has been the recipient of over 50 awards, honors and grants for her work including a Rockefeller Foundation Next Generation Leadership Fellowship for "creating innovative media projects that strengthen democracy", a National Endowment for the Arts Grant, a Radcliffe Institute (Bunting) Film/Video Fellowship from Harvard University  and the Visionary Award from Dartmouth College.

A native of Massachusetts, Canner lives in Vermont and New York City, with her husband, Alex Barnett. She previously lived with writer Pagan Kennedy in a set-up they have described as similar to a Boston marriage.

Films
Orgasm Inc. (2009)
Deadly Embrace: Nicaragua, the World Bank and the International Monetary Fund (1995)
State of Emergency: Inside the LAPD (1993) (Co-Director Julia Meltzer)
Busting the Hype on the LA Riots (1993) (Co-Director Julia Meltzer)
Hands on the Verdict: The 1992 LA Uprising (1992) (Co-coordinating Producer Julia Meltzer)

Digital public art documentary projects
Hidden Tribe (2006)
Bridges (2004)
Moving Visions (2003)
Symphony of a City (2001) (Co-director John Ewing)

Multi-media installations
Distilling the Essence of Women (2004)
Dream Colony (1996)

Anti-ad films
Krafty (1999) (with the Anti-ad Agency)
SUV (1998) (with the Anti-ad Agency)
Nike (1998) (with the Anti-ad Agency)

References

External links
 

American women film directors
English-language film directors
Brown University alumni
Living people
1968 births
21st-century American women